Shining Ones may refer to:
The Phaedriades, the two cliffs that enclose the sacred site of Delphi
The second novel in The Tamuli trilogy by David Eddings
"The Shining Ones", a short story by Arthur C. Clarke from the 1991 collection More Than One Universe